Ziou is a department or commune of Nahouri Province in southeastern Burkina Faso bordering Togo. Its capital lies at the town of Ziou.

References

Departments of Burkina Faso
Nahouri Province